Rosalind Elsie Franklin (25 July 192016 April 1958) was a British  chemist and X-ray crystallographer whose work was central to the understanding of the molecular structures of DNA (deoxyribonucleic acid), RNA (ribonucleic acid), viruses, coal, and graphite. Although her works on coal and viruses were appreciated in her lifetime, Franklin’s contributions to the discovery of the structure of DNA were largely unrecognized during her life, for which she has been variously referred to as the "wronged heroine", the "dark lady of DNA", the "forgotten heroine", a "feminist icon", and the "Sylvia Plath of molecular biology".

Franklin graduated in 1941 with a degree in natural sciences from Newnham College, Cambridge, and then enrolled for a PhD in physical chemistry under Ronald George Wreyford Norrish, the 1920 Chair of Physical Chemistry at the University of Cambridge. Disappointed by Norrish's lack of enthusiasm, she took up a research position under the British Coal Utilisation Research Association (BCURA) in 1942. The research on coal helped Franklin earn a PhD from Cambridge in 1945. After joining King's College London in 1951 as a research associate, Franklin discovered some key properties of DNA, which eventually facilitated the correct description of the double helix structure of DNA. Owing to disagreement with her director, John Randall, and her colleague Maurice Wilkins, Franklin was compelled to move to Birkbeck College in 1953.

Franklin is best known for her work on the X-ray diffraction images of DNA while at King's College London, particularly Photo 51, taken by her student Raymond Gosling, which led to the discovery of the DNA double helix for which Francis Crick, James Watson, and Maurice Wilkins shared the Nobel Prize in Physiology or Medicine in 1962. Watson suggested that Franklin would have ideally been awarded a Nobel Prize in Chemistry, along with Wilkins but, although there was not yet a rule against posthumous awards, the Nobel Committee generally did not make posthumous nominations.

Working under John Desmond Bernal, Franklin led pioneering work at Birkbeck on the molecular structures of viruses. On the day before she was to unveil the structure of tobacco mosaic virus at an international fair in Brussels, Franklin died of ovarian cancer at the age of 37 in 1958. Her team member Aaron Klug continued her research, winning the Nobel Prize in Chemistry in 1982.

Early life
Franklin was born in 50 Chepstow Villas, Notting Hill, London, into an affluent and influential British Jewish family.

Family
Franklin's father, Ellis Arthur Franklin (1894–1964), was a politically liberal London merchant banker who taught at the city's Working Men's College, and her mother was Muriel Frances Waley (1894–1976). Rosalind was the elder daughter and the second child in the family of five children. David (1919–1986) was the eldest brother; Colin (1923–2020), Roland (born 1926), and Jenifer (born 1929) were her younger siblings.

Franklin's paternal great-uncle was Herbert Samuel (later Viscount Samuel), who was the Home Secretary in 1916 and the first practising Jew to serve in the British Cabinet. Her aunt, Helen Caroline Franklin, known in the family as Mamie, was married to Norman de Mattos Bentwich, who was the Attorney General in the British Mandate of Palestine. Helen was active in trade union organisation and the women's suffrage movement and was later a member of the London County Council. Franklin's uncle, Hugh Franklin, was another prominent figure in the suffrage movement, although his actions therein embarrassed the Franklin family. Rosalind's middle name, "Elsie", was in memory of Hugh's first wife, who died in the 1918 flu pandemic. Her family was actively involved with the Working Men's College, where her father taught the subjects of electricity, magnetism, and the history of the Great War in the evenings, later becoming the vice principal.

Franklin's parents helped settle Jewish refugees from Europe who had escaped the Nazis, particularly those from the Kindertransport. They took in two Jewish children to their home, and one of them, a nine-year-old Austrian, Evi Eisenstädter, shared Jenifer's room. (Evi's father Hans Mathias Eisenstädter had been imprisoned in Buchenwald, and after liberation, the family adopted the surname "Ellis".)

Education
From early childhood, Franklin showed exceptional scholastic abilities. At age six, she joined her brother Roland at Norland Place School, a private day school in West London. At that time, her aunt Mamie (Helen Bentwich), described her to her husband: "Rosalind is alarmingly clever – she spends all her time doing arithmetic for pleasure, and invariably gets her sums right." She also developed an early interest in cricket and hockey. At age nine, Franklin entered a boarding school, Lindores School for Young Ladies in Sussex. The school was near the seaside, and the family wanted a good environment for her delicate health.

Franklin was 11 when she went to St Paul's Girls' School in Hammersmith, west London, one of the few girls' schools in London that taught physics and chemistry. At St Paul's, she excelled in science, Latin, and sports. Franklin also learned German, and became fluent in French, a language she would later find useful. She topped her classes, and won annual awards. Franklin’s only educational weakness was in music, for which the school music director, the composer Gustav Holst, once called upon her mother to enquire whether she might have suffered from hearing problems or tonsillitis. With six distinctions, Franklin passed her matriculation in 1938, winning a scholarship for university, the School Leaving Exhibition of £30 a year for three years, and £5 from her grandfather. Her father asked her to give the scholarship to a deserving refugee student.

Cambridge and World War II
Franklin went to Newnham College, Cambridge, in 1938 and studied chemistry within the Natural Sciences Tripos. There, she met the spectroscopist Bill Price, who worked with her as a laboratory demonstrator and who later became one of her senior colleagues at King's College London. In 1941, Franklin was awarded second-class honours from her final exams. The distinction was accepted as a bachelor's degree in qualifications for employment. Cambridge began awarding titular BA and MA degrees to women from 1947, and the previous women graduates retroactively received these. In her last year at Cambridge, Franklin met a French refugee Adrienne Weill, a former student of Marie Curie, who had a huge influence on her life and career and who helped her to improve her conversational French.

Franklin was awarded a research fellowship at Newnham College, with which she joined the physical chemistry laboratory of the University of Cambridge to work under Ronald George Wreyford Norrish, who later won the Nobel Prize in Chemistry. In her one year of work there, Franklin did not have much success. As described by his biographer, Norrish was "obstinate and almost perverse in argument, overbearing and sensitive to criticism". He could not decide upon the assignment of work for her. At that time, Norrish was succumbing due to heavy drinking. Franklin wrote that he made her despise him completely. Resigning from Norrish's Lab, Franklin fulfilled the requirements of the National Service Acts by working as an assistant research officer at the British Coal Utilisation Research Association (BCURA) in 1942. The BCURA was located on the Coombe Springs Estate near Kingston upon Thames near the southwestern boundary of London. Norrish acted as advisor to the military at BCURA. John G. Bennett was the director. Marcello Pirani and Victor Goldschmidt, both refugees from the Nazis, were consultants and lectured at BCURA while Franklin worked there. During her BCURA research, Franklin initially stayed at Adrienne Weill's boarding house in Cambridge until her cousin, Irene Franklin, proposed that they share living quarters at a vacated house in Putney that belonged to her uncle. With Irene, Rosalind volunteered as an Air Raid Warden and regularly made patrols to see the welfare of people during air raids.

Franklin studied the porosity of coal using helium to determine its density. Through this, she discovered the relationship between the fine constrictions in the pores of coals and the permeability of the porous space. By concluding that substances were expelled in order of molecular size as temperature increased, she helped classify coals and accurately predict their performance for fuel purposes and for production of wartime devices such as gas masks. This work was the basis of Franklin’s PhD thesis The physical chemistry of solid organic colloids with special reference to coal for which the University of Cambridge awarded her a PhD in 1945. It was also the basis of several papers.

Career and research

Paris
With World War II ending in 1945, Franklin asked Adrienne Weill for help and to let her know of job openings for "a physical chemist who knows very little physical chemistry, but quite a lot about the holes in coal." At a conference in the autumn of 1946, Weill introduced Franklin to Marcel Mathieu, a director of the Centre national de la recherche scientifique (CNRS), the network of institutes that comprises the major part of the scientific research laboratories supported by the French government. This led to her appointment with Jacques Mering at the Laboratoire Central des Services Chimiques de l'État in Paris. Franklin joined the labo (as referred to by the staff) of Mering on 14 February 1947 as one of the fifteen chercheurs (researchers).

Mering was an X-ray crystallographer who applied X-ray diffraction to the study of rayon and other amorphous substances, in contrast to the thousands of regular crystals that had been studied by this method for many years. He taught her the practical aspects of applying X-ray crystallography to amorphous substances. This presented new challenges in the conduct of experiments and the interpretation of results. Franklin applied them to further problems related to coal and to other carbonaceous materials, in particular the changes to the arrangement of atoms when these are converted to graphite. She published several further papers on this work which has become part of the mainstream of the physics and chemistry of coal and carbon. Franklin coined the terms graphitising and non-graphitising carbon. The coal work was covered in a 1993 monograph, and in the regularly-published textbook Chemistry and Physics of Carbon. Mering continued the study of carbon in various forms, using X-ray diffraction and other methods.

King's College London

In 1950, Franklin was granted a three-year Turner & Newall Fellowship to work at King's College London. In January 1951, she started working as a research associate in the Medical Research Council's (MRC) Biophysics Unit, directed by John Randall. She was originally appointed to work on X-ray diffraction of proteins and lipids in solution, but Randall redirected Franklin’s work to DNA fibres because of new developments in the field, and she was to be the only experienced experimental diffraction researcher at King's at the time. Randall made this reassignment, even before Franklin started working at King's, because of the pioneering work by DNA researcher Maurice Wilkins, and he reassigned Raymond Gosling, the graduate student who had been working with Wilkins, to be her assistant.

In 1950, Swiss chemist Rudolf Signer in Berne prepared a highly purified DNA sample from calf thymus. He freely distributed the DNA sample, later referred to as the Signer DNA, in early May 1950 at the meeting of the Faraday Society in London, and Wilkins was one of the recipients. Even using crude equipment, Wilkins and Gosling had obtained a good-quality diffraction picture of the DNA sample which sparked further interest in this molecule. But Randall had not indicated to them that he had asked Franklin to take over both the DNA diffraction work and guidance of Gosling's thesis. It was while Wilkins was away on holiday that Randall, in a letter in December 1950, assured Franklin that "as far as the experimental X-ray effort there would be for the moment only yourself and Gosling." Randall's lack of communication about this reassignment significantly contributed to the well documented friction that developed between Wilkins and Franklin. When Wilkins returned, he handed over the Signer DNA and Gosling to Franklin.

Franklin, now working with Gosling, started to apply her expertise in X-ray diffraction techniques to the structure of DNA. She used a new fine-focus X-ray tube and microcamera ordered by Wilkins, but which she refined, adjusted and focused carefully. Drawing upon her physical chemistry background, a critical innovation Franklin applied was making the camera chamber that could be controlled for its humidity using different saturated salt solutions. When Wilkins enquired about this improved technique, she replied in terms which offended him as she had "an air of cool superiority".

Franklin's habit of intensely looking people in the eye while being concise, impatient and direct unnerved many of her colleagues. In stark contrast, Wilkins was very shy, and slowly calculating in speech while he avoided looking anyone directly in the eye. With the ingenious humidity-controlling camera, Franklin was soon able to produce X-ray images of better quality than those of Wilkins. She immediately discovered that the DNA sample could exist in two forms: at a relative humidity higher than 75%, the DNA fibre became long and thin; when it was drier, it became short and fat. She originally referred to the former as "wet" and the latter as "crystalline."

On the structure of the crystalline DNA, Franklin first recorded the analysis in her notebook, which reads: "Evidence for spiral [meaning helical] structure. Straight chain untwisted is highly improbable. Absence of reflections on meridian in χtalline [crystalline] form suggests spiral structure." An immediate discovery from this was that the phosphate group lies outside of the main DNA chain; Franklin, however could not make out whether there could be two or three chains. She presented their data at a lecture in November 1951, in King's College London. In her lecture notes, Franklin wrote the following:The results suggest a helical structure (which must be very closely packed) containing 2, 3 or 4 co-axial nucleic acid chains per helical unit, and having the phosphate groups near the outside.Franklin then named "A" and "B" respectively for the "crystalline" and "wet" forms. (The biological functions of A-DNA were discovered only 60 years later.) Because of the intense personality conflict developing between Franklin and Wilkins, Randall divided the work on DNA. Franklin chose the data rich "A" form while Wilkins selected the "B" form.  

By the end of 1951, it became generally accepted at King's that the B-DNA was a helix, but after Franklin had recorded an asymmetrical image in May 1952, Franklin became unconvinced that the A-DNA was a helix. In July 1952, as a practical joke on Wilkins (who frequently expressed his view that both forms of DNA were helical), Franklin and Gosling produced a funeral notice regretting the 'death' of helical A-DNA, which runs:It is with great regret that we have to announce the death, on Friday 18th July 1952 of DNA helix (crystalline). Death followed a protracted illness which an intensive course of Besselised [referring to Bessel function that was used to analyse the X-ray diffraction patterns] injections had failed to relieve. A memorial service will be held next Monday or Tuesday. It is hoped that Dr M H F Wilkins will speak in memory of the late helix. [Signed Rosalind Franklin and Raymond Gosling.]During 1952, they worked at applying the Patterson function to the X-ray pictures of DNA they had produced. This was a long and labour-intensive approach but would yield significant insight into the structure of the molecule. Franklin was fully committed to experimental data and was sternly against theoretical or model buildings, as she said, "We are not going to speculate, we are going to wait, we are going to let the spots on this photograph tell us what the [DNA] structure is." The X-ray diffraction pictures, including the landmark Photo 51 taken by Gosling at this time, have been called by John Desmond Bernal as "amongst the most beautiful X-ray photographs of any substance ever taken".

By January 1953, Franklin had reconciled her conflicting data, concluding that both DNA forms had two helices, and had started to write a series of three draft manuscripts, two of which included a double helical DNA backbone (see below). Franklin’s two A-DNA manuscripts reached Acta Crystallographica in Copenhagen on 6 March 1953, the day before Crick and Watson had completed their model on B-DNA. Franklin must have mailed them while the Cambridge team was building their model, and certainly had written them before she knew of their work. On 8 July 1953, Franklin modified one of these "in proof" Acta articles, "in light of recent work" by the King's and Cambridge research teams.

The third draft paper was on the B-DNA, dated 17 March 1953, which was discovered years later amongst her papers, by Franklin's Birkbeck colleague, Aaron Klug. He then published in 1974 an evaluation of the draft's close correlation with the third of the original trio of 25 April 1953 Nature DNA articles. Klug designed this paper to complement the first article he had written in 1968 defending Franklin's significant contribution to DNA structure. Klug had written this first article in response to the incomplete picture of Franklin's work depicted in James Watson's 1968 memoir, The Double Helix.

As vividly described by Watson, he travelled to King's on 30 January 1953 carrying a preprint of Linus Pauling's incorrect proposal for DNA structure. Since Wilkins was not in his office, Watson went to Franklin's lab with his urgent message that they should all collaborate before Pauling discovered his error. The unimpressed Franklin became angry when Watson suggested she did not know how to interpret her own data. Watson hastily retreated, backing into Wilkins who had been attracted by the commotion. Wilkins commiserated with his harried friend and then showed Watson Franklin's DNA X-ray image. Watson, in turn, showed Wilkins a prepublication manuscript by Pauling and Robert Corey, which contained a DNA structure remarkably like their first incorrect model.

Discovery of DNA structure
In February 1953, James Watson and Francis Crick of the Cavendish Laboratory in Cambridge University had started to build a molecular model of the B-DNA using data similar to that available to both teams at King's. Based on Franklin's lecture in November 1951 that DNA was helical with either two or three stands, they constructed a triple helix model, which was immediately proven to be flawed. Franklin's research was completed by February 1953, ahead of her move to Birkbeck, and her data was critical. Model building had been applied successfully in the elucidation of the structure of the alpha helix by Linus Pauling in 1951, but Franklin was opposed to prematurely building theoretical models, until sufficient data were obtained to properly guide the model building. She took the view that building a model was to be undertaken only after enough of the structure was known. Franklin’s conviction was justified by the fact that Pauling and Corey also came up in the late 1952 (published in February 1953) with an erroneous triple helix model.

Ever cautious, Franklin wanted to eliminate misleading possibilities. Photographs of her Birkbeck work table show that Franklin routinely used small molecular models, although certainly not ones on the grand scale successfully used at Cambridge for DNA. In the middle of February 1953, Crick's thesis advisor, Max Perutz, gave Crick a copy of a report written for a Medical Research Council biophysics committee visit to King's in December 1952, containing many of Franklin's crystallographic calculations.

Since Franklin had decided to transfer to Birkbeck College and Randall had insisted that all DNA work must stay at King's, Wilkins was given copies of Franklin's diffraction photographs by Gosling. By 28 February 1953, Watson and Crick felt they had solved the problem enough for Crick to proclaim (in the local pub) that they had "found the secret of life". However, they knew they must complete their model before they could be certain.

Watson and Crick finished building their model on 7 March 1953, a day before they received a letter from Wilkins stating that Franklin was finally leaving and they could put "all hands to the pump". This was also one day after Franklin's two A-DNA papers had reached Acta Crystallographica. Wilkins came to see the model the following week, according to Franklin's biographer Brenda Maddox, on 12 March, and allegedly informed Gosling on his return to King's.

One of the most critical and overlooked moments in DNA research was how and when Franklin realised and conceded that B-DNA was a double helical molecule. When Klug first examined Franklin's documents after her death, he initially came to an impression that Franklin was not convinced of the double helical nature until the knowledge of the Cambridge model. But Klug later discovered the original draft of the manuscript (dated 17 March 1953) from which it became clear that Franklin had already resolved the correct structure. The news of Watson–Crick model reached King's the next day, 18 March, suggesting that Franklin would have learned of it much later since she had moved to Birkbeck. Further scrutiny of her notebook revealed that Franklin had already thought of the helical structure for B-DNA in February 1953 but was not sure of the number of strands, as she wrote: "Evidence for 2-chain (or 1-chain helix)." Her conclusion on the helical nature was evident, though she failed to understand the complete organisation of the DNA strands, as the possibility of two strands running in opposite directions did not occur to her.

Towards the end of February, Franklin began to work out the indications of double strands, as she noted: "Structure B does not fit single helical theory, even for low layer-lines." It soon dawned to her that the B-DNA and A-DNA were structurally similar, and perceived A-DNA as an "unwound version" of B-DNA. Franklin and Gosling wrote a five-paged manuscript on 17 March titled "A Note on Molecular Configuration of Sodium Thymonucleate." After the Watson–Crick model was known, there appeared to be only one (hand-written) modification after the typeset at the end of the text which states that their data was consistent with the model, and appeared as such in the trio of 25 April 1953 Nature articles; the other modification being a deletion of "A Note on" from the title.

Weeks later, on 10 April, Franklin wrote to Crick for permission to see their model. Franklin retained her scepticism for premature model building even after seeing the Watson–Crick model, and remained unimpressed. She is reported to have commented, "It's very pretty, but how are they going to prove it?" As an experimental scientist, Franklin seems to have been interested in producing far greater evidence before publishing-as-proven a proposed model. Accordingly, her response to the Watson–Crick model was in keeping with her cautious approach to science.

Crick and Watson then published their model in Nature on 25 April 1953, in an article describing the double-helical structure of DNA with only a footnote acknowledging "having been stimulated by a general knowledge of Franklin and Wilkins' ‘unpublished’ contribution.” Actually, although it was the bare minimum, they had just enough specific knowledge of Franklin and Gosling's data upon which to base their model. As a result of a deal struck by the two laboratory directors, articles by Wilkins and Franklin, which included their X-ray diffraction data, were modified and then published second and third in the same issue of Nature, seemingly only in support of the Crick and Watson theoretical paper which proposed a model for the B-DNA. Most of the scientific community hesitated several years before accepting the double helix proposal. At first mainly geneticists embraced the model because of its obvious genetic implications.

Birkbeck College

Franklin left King's College London in mid-March 1953 for Birkbeck College, in a move that had been planned for some time and that she described (in a letter to Adrienne Weill in Paris) as "moving from a palace to the slums ... but pleasanter all the same". She was recruited by physics department chair John Desmond Bernal, a crystallographer who was a communist, known for promoting female crystallographers. Her new laboratories were housed in 21 Torrington Square, one of a pair of dilapidated and cramped Georgian houses containing several different departments; Franklin frequently took Bernal to task over the careless attitudes of some of the other laboratory staff, notably after workers in the pharmacy department flooded her first-floor laboratory with water on one occasion.

Despite the parting words of Bernal to stop her interest in nucleic acids, Franklin helped Gosling to finish his thesis, although she was no longer his official supervisor. Together, they published the first evidence of double helix in the A form of DNA in the 25 July issue of Nature. At the end of 1954, Bernal secured funding for Franklin from the Agricultural Research Council (ARC), which enabled her to work as a senior scientist supervising her own research group. John Finch, a physics student from King's College London, subsequently joined Franklin's group, followed by Kenneth Holmes, a Cambridge graduate, in July 1955. Despite the ARC funding, Franklin wrote to Bernal that the existing facilities remained highly unsuited for conducting research "...my desk and lab are on the fourth floor, my X-ray tube in the basement, and I am responsible for the work of four people distributed over the basement, first and second floors on two different staircases."

RNA research
Franklin continued to explore another major nucleic acid, RNA, a molecule equally central to life as DNA. She again used X-ray crystallography to study the structure of the tobacco mosaic virus (TMV), an RNA virus. Her meeting with Aaron Klug in early 1954 led to a longstanding and successful collaboration. Klug had just then earned his PhD from Trinity College, Cambridge, and joined Birkbeck in late 1953. In 1955, Franklin published her first major works on TMV in Nature, where she described that all TMV virus particles were of the same length. This was in direct contradiction to the ideas of the eminent virologist Norman Pirie, though Franklin’s observation ultimately proved correct.

Franklin assigned the study of the complete structure of TMV to her PhD student Holmes. They soon discovered (published in 1956) that the covering of TMV was protein molecules arranged in helices. Her colleague Klug worked on spherical viruses with his student Finch, with Franklin coordinating and overseeing the work. As a team, from 1956 they started publishing seminal works on TMV, cucumber virus 4 and turnip yellow mosaic virus.

Franklin also had a research assistant, James Watt, subsidised by the National Coal Board and was now the leader of the ARC group at Birkbeck. The Birkbeck team members continued working on RNA viruses affecting several plants, including potato, turnip, tomato and pea. In 1955 the team was joined by an American post-doctoral student Donald Caspar. He worked on the precise location of RNA molecules in TMV. In 1956, Caspar and Franklin published individual but complementary papers in the 10 March issue of Nature, in which they showed that the RNA in TMV is wound along the inner surface of the hollow virus. Caspar was not an enthusiastic writer, and Franklin had to write the entire manuscript for him.

Franklin’s research grant from ARC expired at the end of 1957, and she was never given the full salary proposed by Birkbeck. After Bernal requested ARC chairman Lord Rothschild, she was given a one-year extension ending in March 1958.

Expo 58, the first major international fair after World War II, was to be held in Brussels in 1958. Franklin was invited to make a five-foot high model of TMV, which she started in 1957. Her materials included table tennis balls and plastic bicycle handlebar grips. The Brussels world's fair, with an exhibit of her virus model at the International Science Pavilion, opened on 17 April, one day after she died.

Polio virus

In 1956, Franklin visited the University of California, Berkeley, where colleagues suggested her group research the polio virus. In 1957, she applied for a grant from the United States Public Health Service of the National Institutes of Health, which approved £10,000 (equivalent to £ in ) for three years, the largest fund ever received at Birkbeck. In her grant application, Franklin mentioned her new interest in animal virus research. She obtained Bernal's consent in July 1957, though serious concerns were raised after Franklin disclosed her intentions to research live, instead of killed, polio virus at Birkbeck. Eventually, Bernal arranged for the virus to be safely stored at the London School of Hygiene and Tropical Medicine during the group's research. With her group, Franklin then commenced deciphering the structure of the polio virus while it was in a crystalline state. She attempted to mount the virus crystals in capillary tubes for X-ray studies, but was forced to end her work due to her rapidly failing health.

After Franklin's death, Klug succeeded her as group leader, and he, Finch and Holmes continued researching the structure of the polio virus. They eventually succeeded in obtaining extremely detailed X-ray images of the virus. In June 1959, Klug and Finch published the group's findings, revealing the polio virus to have icosahedral symmetry, and in the same paper suggested the possibility for all spherical viruses to possess the same symmetry, as it permitted the greatest possible number (60) of identical structural units. The team moved to the Laboratory of Molecular Biology, Cambridge, in 1962, and the old Torrington Square laboratories were demolished four years later, in May 1966.

Personal life
Franklin was best described as an agnostic. Her lack of religious faith apparently did not stem from anyone's influence, rather from her own line of thinking. She developed her scepticism as a young child. Her mother recalled that she refused to believe in the existence of God, and remarked, "Well, anyhow, how do you know He isn't She?" She later made her position clear, now based on her scientific experience, and wrote to her father in 1940:

However, Franklin did not abandon Jewish traditions. As the only Jewish student at Lindores School, she had Hebrew lessons on her own while her friends went to church. She joined the Jewish Society while in her first term at Cambridge, out of respect of her grandfather's request. Franklin confided to her sister that she was "always consciously a Jew".

Franklin loved travelling abroad, particularly trekking. She first "qualified" at Christmas 1929 for a vacation at Menton, France, where her grandfather went to escape the English winter. Her family frequently spent vacations in Wales or Cornwall. A trip to France in 1938 gave Franklin a lasting love for France and its language. She considered the French lifestyle at that time as "vastly superior to that of English". In contrast, Franklin described English people as having "vacant stupid faces and childlike complacency". Her family was almost stuck in Norway in 1939, as World War II was declared on their way home. In another instance, Franklin trekked the French Alps with Jean Kerslake in 1946, which almost cost her her life. Franklin slipped off a slope, and was barely rescued. But she wrote to her mother, "I am quite sure I could wander happily in France forever. I love the people, the country and the food."

Franklin made several professional trips to the United States, and was particularly jovial among her American friends and constantly displayed her sense of humour. William Ginoza of the University of California, Los Angeles, later recalled that Franklin was the opposite of Watson's description of her, and as Maddox comments, Americans enjoyed her "sunny side".

In his book The Double Helix, Watson provides his first-person account of the search for and discovery of DNA. He paints a sympathetic but sometimes critical portrait of Franklin. He praises her intellect and scientific acumen, but portrays Franklin as difficult to work with and careless with her appearance. After introducing her in the book as "Rosalind", he writes that he and his male colleagues usually referred to her as "Rosy", the name people at King's College London used behind her back. Franklin did not want to be called by that name because she had a great-aunt Rosy. In the family, she was called "Ros". To others, Franklin was simply "Rosalind". She made it clear to an American visiting friend, Dorothea Raacke, while sitting with her at Crick's table in The Eagle pub in Cambridge: Raacke asked her how she was to be called and she replied "I'm afraid it will have to be Rosalind", adding "Most definitely not Rosy."

Franklin often expressed her political views. She initially blamed Winston Churchill for inciting the war, but later admired him for his speeches. Franklin actively supported Professor John Ryle as an independent candidate for parliament in the 1940 Cambridge University by-election, but he was unsuccessful.

Franklin did not seem to have an intimate relationship with anyone, and always kept her deepest personal feelings to herself. After her younger days, she avoided close friendship with the opposite sex. In her later years, Evi Ellis, who had shared her bedroom when a child refugee and who was then married to Ernst Wohlgemuth and had moved to Notting Hill from Chicago, tried matchmaking her with Ralph Miliband but failed. Franklin once told Evi that her flatmate asked her for a drink, but she did not understand the intention. She was quite infatuated by her French mentor Mering, who had a wife and a mistress. Mering also admitted that he was captivated by her "intelligence and beauty". According to Anne Sayre, Franklin did confess her feeling for Mering when she was undergoing a second surgery, but Maddox reported that the family denied this. Mering wept when he visited her later, and destroyed all her letters after her death.

Franklin’s closest personal affair was probably with her once post-doctoral student Donald Caspar. In 1956, she visited him at his home in Colorado after her tour to University of California, Berkeley, and she was known to remark later that Caspar was one "she might have loved, might have married". In her letter to Sayre, Franklin described him as "an ideal match".

Illness, death, and burial
In mid-1956, while on a work-related trip to the United States, Franklin first began to suspect a health problem. While in New York, she found difficulty in zipping her skirt; her stomach had bulged. Back in London, Franklin consulted Mair Livingstone, who asked her, "You're not pregnant?" to which she retorted, "I wish I were." Her case was marked "URGENT". An operation on 4 September of the same year revealed two tumours in her abdomen. After this period and other periods of hospitalisation, Franklin spent time convalescing with various friends and family members. These included Anne Sayre, Francis Crick, his wife Odile, with whom Franklin had formed a strong friendship, and finally with the Roland and Nina Franklin family where Rosalind's nieces and nephews bolstered her spirits.

Franklin chose not to stay with her parents because her mother's uncontrollable grief and crying upset her too much. Even while undergoing cancer treatment, Franklin continued to work, and her group continued to produce results – seven papers in 1956 and six more in 1957. At the end of 1957, Franklin again fell ill and she was admitted to the Royal Marsden Hospital. On 2 December, she made her will. Franklin named her three brothers as executors and made her colleague Aaron Klug the principal beneficiary, who would receive £3,000 and her Austin car. Of her other friends, Mair Livingstone would get £2,000, Anne Piper £1,000, and her nurse Miss Griffith £250. The remainder of the estate was to be used for charities.

Franklin returned to work in January 1958, and was also given a promotion to Research Associate in Biophysics on 25 February. She fell ill again on 30 March, and died a few weeks later on 16 April 1958, in Chelsea, London, of bronchopneumonia, secondary carcinomatosis, and ovarian cancer. Exposure to X-ray radiation is sometimes considered to be a possible factor in Franklin’s illness.
Other members of her family have died of cancer, and the incidence of gynaecological cancer is known to be disproportionately high among Ashkenazi Jews. Franklin’s death certificate states: A Research Scientist, Spinster, Daughter of Ellis Arthur Franklin, a Banker. She was interred on 17 April 1958 in the family plot at Willesden United Synagogue Cemetery at Beaconsfield Road in London Borough of Brent. The inscription on her tombstone reads:
IN MEMORY OF  ROSALIND ELSIE FRANKLIN  מ' רחל בת ר' יהודה [Rochel/Rachel daughter of Yehuda, her father's Hebrew name] DEARLY LOVED ELDER DAUGHTER OF  ELLIS AND MURIEL FRANKLIN  25TH JULY 1920 – 16TH APRIL 1958  SCIENTIST  HER RESEARCH AND DISCOVERIES ON  VIRUSES REMAIN OF LASTING BENEFIT  TO MANKIND  ת נ צ ב ה [Hebrew initials for "her soul shall be bound in the bundle of life"]

Franklin's will was proven on 30 June, with her estate assessed for probate at £11,278 10s. 9d. (equivalent to £ in ).

Controversies after death

Alleged sexism toward Franklin
Anne Sayre, Franklin's friend and one of her biographers, says in her 1975 book, Rosalind Franklin and DNA:  "In 1951 ... King's College London as an institution, was not distinguished for the welcome that it offered to women ... Rosalind ... was unused to purdah [a religious and social institution of female seclusion] ... there was one other female on the laboratory staff". The molecular biologist Andrzej Stasiak notes: "Sayre's book became widely cited in feminist circles for exposing rampant sexism in science." Farooq Hussain says: "there were seven women in the biophysics department ... Jean Hanson became an FRS, Dame Honor B. Fell, Director of Strangeways Laboratory, supervised the biologists". Maddox states: "Randall ... did have many women on his staff ... they found him ... sympathetic and helpful."

Sayre asserts that "while the male staff at King's lunched in a large, comfortable, rather clubby dining room" the female staff of all ranks "lunched in the student's hall or away from the premises". However, Elkin claims that most of the MRC group (including Franklin) typically ate lunch together in the mixed dining room discussed below. And Maddox says, of Randall: "He liked to see his flock, men and women, come together for morning coffee, and at lunch in the joint dining room, where he ate with them nearly every day." Francis Crick also commented that "her colleagues treated men and women scientists alike".

Sayre also discusses at length Franklin's struggle in pursuing science, particularly her father's concern about women in academic professions. This account had led to accusations of sexism in regard to Ellis Franklin's attitude to his daughter. A good deal of information explicitly claims that he strongly opposed her entering Newnham College. The Public Broadcasting Service (PBS) biography of Franklin goes further, stating that he refused to pay her fees, and that an aunt stepped in to do that for her. Her sister, Jenifer Glynn, has stated that those stories are myths, and that her parents fully supported Franklin's entire career.

Sexism is said to pervade the memoir of one peer, James Watson, in his book The Double Helix, published 10 years after Franklin's death and after Watson had returned from Cambridge to Harvard. His Cambridge colleague, Peter Pauling, wrote in a letter, "Morris [sic] Wilkins is supposed to be doing this work; Miss Franklin is evidently a fool." Crick acknowledges later, "I'm afraid we always used to adopt – let's say, a patronizing attitude towards her."

Glynn accuses Sayre of erroneously making her sister a feminist heroine, and sees Watson's The Double Helix as the root of what she calls the "Rosalind Industry". She conjectures that the stories of alleged sexism would "have embarrassed her [Rosalind Franklin] almost as much as Watson's account would have upset her", and declared that "she [Rosalind] was never a feminist." Klug and Crick have also concurred that Franklin was definitely not a feminist.

Franklin's letter to her parents in January 1939 is often taken as reflecting her own prejudiced attitude, and the claim that she was "not immune to the sexism rampant in these circles". In the letter, she remarked that one lecturer was "very good, though female". Maddox maintains that was a circumstantial comment rather than an example of gender bias, and that it was a expression of admiration because, at the time, woman teachers of science were a rarity. In fact, Maddox says, Franklin laughed at men who were embarrassed by the appointment of the first female professor, Dorothy Garrod.

Contribution to the model/structure of DNA
Franklin's first important contributions to the model popularised by Crick and Watson was her lecture at the seminar in November 1951, where she presented to those present, among them Watson, the two forms of the molecule, type A and type B, her position being that the phosphate units are located in the external part of the molecule. She also specified the amount of water to be found in the molecule in accordance with other parts of it, data that have considerable importance for the stability of the molecule. Franklin was the first to discover and formulate these facts, which in fact constituted the basis for all later attempts to build a model of the molecule. However, Watson, at the time ignorant of the chemistry, failed to comprehend the crucial information, and this led to the construction of a wrong three-helical model.

The other contribution included an X-ray photograph of B-DNA (called Photo 51) taken by Franklin's student Gosling that was briefly shown to Watson by Wilkins in January 1953, and a report written for an MRC biophysics committee visit to King's in December 1952 which was shown by Perutz at the Cavendish Laboratory to both Crick and Watson. This MRC report contained data from the King's group, including some of Franklin's and Gosling's work, and was given to Crick – who was working on his thesis on haemoglobin structure – by his thesis supervisor Perutz, a member of the visiting committee.

Sayre's biography of Franklin contains a story alleging that the photograph 51 in question was shown to Watson by Wilkins without Franklin's permission, and that this constituted a case of bad science ethics. Others dispute this story, asserting that Wilkins had been given photograph 51 by Franklin's PhD student Gosling because she was leaving King's to work at Birkbeck, and there was allegedly nothing untoward in this transfer of data to Wilkins because Director Randall had insisted that all DNA work belonged exclusively to King's and had instructed Franklin in a letter to even stop working on it and submit her data. Also, it was implied by Horace Freeland Judson, that Maurice Wilkins had taken the photograph out of Franklin's drawer, but this is also said to be incorrect.

Likewise, Perutz saw "no harm" in showing an MRC report containing the conclusions of Franklin and Gosling's X-ray data analysis to Crick, since it had not been marked as confidential, although "The report was not expected to reach outside eyes". Indeed, after the publication of Watson's The Double Helix exposed Perutz's act, he received so many letters questioning his judgment that he felt the need to both answer them all and to post a general statement in Science excusing himself on the basis of being "inexperienced and casual in administrative matters".

Perutz also claimed that the MRC information was already made available to the Cambridge team when Watson had attended Franklin's seminar in November 1951. A preliminary version of much of the important material contained in the 1952 December MRC report had been presented by Franklin in a talk she had given in November 1951, which Watson had attended but not understood.

The Perutz letter was as said one of three letters, published with letters by Wilkins and Watson, which discussed their various contributions. Watson clarified the importance of the data obtained from the MRC report as he had not recorded these data while attending Franklin's lecture in 1951. The upshot of all this was that when Crick and Watson started to build their model in February 1953 they were working with critical parameters that had been determined by Franklin in 1951, and which she and Gosling had significantly refined in 1952, as well as with published data and other very similar data to those available at King's. It was generally believed that Franklin was never aware that her work had been used during construction of the model, but Gosling asserted in his 2013 interview that, "Yes. Oh, she did know about that."

Recognition of her contribution to the model of DNA
Upon the completion of their model, Crick and Watson had invited Wilkins to be a co-author of their paper describing the structure. Wilkins turned down this offer, as he had taken no part in building the model. He later expressed regret that greater discussion of co-authorship had not taken place as this might have helped to clarify the contribution the work at King's had made to the discovery. There is no doubt that Franklin's experimental data were used by Crick and Watson to build their model of DNA in 1953. Some, including Maddox, have explained this citation omission by suggesting that it may be a question of circumstance, because it would have been very difficult to cite the unpublished work from the MRC report they had seen.

Indeed, a clear timely acknowledgment would have been awkward, given the unorthodox manner in which data were transferred from King's to Cambridge. However, methods were available. Watson and Crick could have cited the MRC report as a personal communication or else cited the Acta articles in press, or most easily, the third Nature paper that they knew was in press. One of the most important accomplishments of Maddox's widely acclaimed biography is that Maddox made a well-received case for inadequate acknowledgement. "Such acknowledgement as they gave her was very muted and always coupled with the name of Wilkins".

Fifteen years after the fact, the first clear recitation of Franklin's contribution appeared as it permeated Watson's account, The Double Helix, although it was buried under descriptions of Watson's (often quite negative) regard towards Franklin during the period of their work on DNA. This attitude is epitomized in the confrontation between Watson and Franklin over a preprint of Pauling's mistaken DNA manuscript. Watson's words impelled Sayre to write her rebuttal, in which the entire chapter nine, "Winner Take All" has the structure of a legal brief dissecting and analyzing the topic of acknowledgement.

Sayre's early analysis was often ignored because of perceived feminist overtones in her book. Watson and Crick did not cite the X-ray diffraction work of Wilkins and Franklin in their original paper, though they admit having "been stimulated by a knowledge of the general nature of the unpublished experimental results and ideas of Dr. M. H. F. Wilkins, Dr. R. E. Franklin and their co-workers at King's College London". In fact, Watson and Crick cited no experimental data at all in support of their model. Franklin and Gosling's publication of the DNA X-ray image, in the same issue of Nature, served as the principal evidence:Thus our general ideas are not inconsistent with the model proposed by Watson and Crick in the preceding communication.

Nobel Prize
Franklin was never nominated for a Nobel Prize. Her work was a crucial part in the discovery of DNA's structure, which along with subsequent related work led to Francis Crick, James Watson, and Maurice Wilkins being awarded a Nobel Prize in 1962. Franklin had died in 1958, and during her lifetime, the DNA structure was not considered to be fully proven. It took Wilkins and his colleagues about seven years to collect enough data to prove and refine the proposed DNA structure. Moreover, its biological significance, as proposed by Watson and Crick, was not established. General acceptance for the DNA double helix and its function did not start until late in the 1950s, leading to Nobel nominations in 1960, 1961, and 1962 for Nobel Prize in Physiology or Medicine, and in 1962 for Nobel Prize in Chemistry. The first breakthrough was from Matthew Meselson and Franklin Stahl in 1958, who experimentally showed the DNA replication of a bacterium Escherichia coli. In what is now known as the Meselson–Stahl experiment, DNA was found to replicate into two double-stranded helices, with each helix having one of the original DNA strands. This DNA replication was firmly established by 1961 after further demonstration in other species, and of the stepwise chemical reaction. According to the 1961 Crick–Monod letter, this experimental proof, along with Wilkins having initiated the DNA diffraction work, were the reasons why Crick felt that Wilkins should be included in the DNA Nobel Prize.

In 1962 the Nobel Prize was subsequently awarded to Crick, Watson, and Wilkins. Nobel rules now prohibit posthumous nominations (though this statute was not formally in effect until 1974) or splitting of Prizes more than three ways. The award was for their body of work on nucleic acids and not exclusively for the discovery of the structure of DNA. By the time of the award Wilkins had been working on the structure of DNA for more than 10 years, and had done much to confirm the Watson–Crick model. Crick had been working on the genetic code at Cambridge and Watson had worked on RNA for some years. Watson has suggested that ideally Wilkins and Franklin would have been awarded the Nobel Prize in Chemistry. Pauling, who received the Nobel Peace Prize that year, believed and earlier warned the Nobel Committee in 1960 that "it might well be premature to make an award of a Prize to Watson and Crick, because of existing uncertainty about the detailed structure of nucleic acid. I myself feel that it is likely that the general nature of the Watson-Crick structure is correct, but that there is doubt about details." He was partly right as an alternative of Watson-Crick base pairing, called the Hoogsteen base pairing that can form triple DNA strand, was discovered by Karst Hoogsteen in 1963.

Aaron Klug, Franklin's colleague and principal beneficiary in her will, was the sole winner of the Nobel Prize in Chemistry 1982, "for his development of crystallographic electron microscopy and his structural elucidation of biologically important nucleic acid-protein complexes". This work was exactly what Franklin had started and which she introduced to Klug, and it is highly plausible that, were she alive, Franklin would have shared the Nobel Prize.

Awards and honours

Posthumous recognition
 1982, Iota Sigma Pi designated Franklin a National Honorary Member.
 1984, St Paul's Girls School established the Rosalind Franklin Technology Centre.

 1992, English Heritage placed a blue plaque commemorating Franklin on the building in Drayton Gardens, London, where she lived until her death.
 1993, King's College London renamed the Orchard Residence at its Hampstead Campus as Rosalind Franklin Hall.
 1993, King's College London placed a blue plaque on its outside wall bearing the inscription: "R. E. Franklin, R. G. Gosling, A. R. Stokes, M. H. F. Wilkins, H. R. Wilson – King's College London – DNA – X-ray diffraction studies – 1953."
 1995, Newnham College, Cambridge opened a graduate residence named Rosalind Franklin Building, and put a bust of her in its garden.
 1997, Birkbeck, University of London School of Crystallography opened the Rosalind Franklin Laboratory.
 1997, a newly discovered asteroid was named 9241 Rosfranklin.
 1998, National Portrait Gallery in London added Rosalind Franklin's portrait next to those of Francis Crick, James Watson and Maurice Wilkins.
 1999, the Institute of Physics at Portland Place, London, renamed its theatre as Franklin Lecture Theatre.
 2000, King's College London opened the Franklin–Wilkins Building in honour of Franklin's and Wilkins's work at the college.
 2000, We the Curious (formally @Bristol) features the Rosalind Franklin Room.
 2001, the American National Cancer Institute established the Rosalind E. Franklin Award for women in cancer research.
 2002, the University of Groningen, supported by the European Union, launched the Rosalind Franklin Fellowship to encourage women researchers to become full university professors.
 2003, the Royal Society established the Rosalind Franklin Award (officially the Royal Society Rosalind Franklin Award and Lecture) for an outstanding contribution to any area of natural science, engineering or technology. The award consists of a silver-coated medal and a grant of £30,000.
 2003, the Royal Society of Chemistry declared King's College London as "National Historic Chemical Landmark" and placed a plaque on the wall near the entrance of the building, with the inscription: "Near this site Rosalind Franklin, Maurice Wilkins, Raymond Gosling, Alexander Stokes and Herbert Wilson performed experiments that led to the discovery of the structure of DNA. This work revolutionised our understanding of the chemistry behind life itself."

 2004, Finch University of Health Sciences/The Chicago Medical School, located in North Chicago, Illinois, USA changed its name to the Rosalind Franklin University of Medicine and Science. It also adopted a new motto "Life in Discovery", and Photo 51 as its logo.
 2004, the Gruber Foundation started the Rosalind Franklin Young Investigator Award for two female geneticists from all over the world. It carries an annual fund of $25,000, each award is for three years, and selection is made by a joint committee appointed by the Genetics Society of America and the American Society of Human Genetics.
 2004, the Advanced Photon Source (APS) and the APS Users Organization (APSUO) started the APSUO Rosalind Franklin Young Investigator Award for young scientists who made contributions through the APS.
 2005, the DNA sculpture (donated by James Watson) outside Clare College, Cambridge's Memorial Court incorporates the words "The double helix model was supported by the work of Rosalind Franklin and Maurice Wilkins."
 2005, the Ovarian Cancer Research Alliance, based in Florida, US, established an annual award the Rosalind Franklin Prize for Excellence in Ovarian Cancer Research.
 2006, the Rosalind Franklin Society was established in New York by Mary Ann Liebert. The Society aims to recognise, foster, and advance the important contributions of women in the life sciences and affiliated disciplines.
 2008, Columbia University awarded an honorary Louisa Gross Horwitz Prize to Franklin, "for her seminal contributions to the discovery of the structure of DNA".
 2008, the Institute of Physics established a biennial award the Rosalind Franklin Medal and Prize.
 2012, the bioinformatics education software platform Rosalind was named in honour of Franklin.
 2012, The Rosalind Franklin Building was opened at Nottingham Trent University.
 2013, Google honoured Rosalind Franklin with a doodle, showing her gazing at a double helix structure of DNA with an X-ray of Photo 51 beyond it.
 2013, a plaque was placed on the wall of The Eagle pub in Cambridge commemorating Franklin's contribution to the discovery of the structure of DNA, on the sixtieth anniversary of Crick and Watson's announcement in the pub.
 2014, the Rosalind Franklin Award for Leadership in Industrial Biotechnology was established by Biotechnology Industry Organization (Biotechnology Innovation Organization since 2016) in collaboration with the Rosalind Franklin Society, for an outstanding woman in the field of industrial biotechnology and bioprocessing.
 2014, the Rosalind Franklin University of Medicine and Science unveiled a bronze statue of Franklin, created by Julie Rotblatt-Amrany, near its front entrance.
 2014, the Rosalind Franklin STEM Elementary was opened in Pasco, Washington, the first science, technology, engineering, and math (STEM) elementary school in the district.
 2014, the University of Wolverhampton opened its new laboratory building named the Rosalind Franklin Science Building.
 2015, Newnham College Boat Club, Cambridge, launched a new racing VIII, naming it the Rosalind Franklin.
 2015, the Rosalind Franklin Appathon was launched by University College London as a national app competition for women in STEMM (science, technology, engineering, maths and medicine).
 2015, a high performance computing and cloud facility in London was named Rosalind.
 2016, the British Humanist Association added the Rosalind Franklin Lecture to its annual lecture series, aimed to explore and celebrate the contribution of women towards the promotion and advancement of humanism.
 2016, the Rosalind Franklin Prize and Tech Day was held on 23 February in London, organised by University College London, i-sense, UCL Enterprise, the London Centre for Nanotechnology and the UCL Athena SWAN Charter.
 2017, DSM opened the Rosalind Franklin Biotechnology Center in Delft, the Netherlands.
 2017, Historic England gave a heritage listing, at Grade II, to Franklin's tomb at Willesden Jewish Cemetery on the grounds of it being of "special architectural or historic interest".  Historic England said that "the tomb commemorates the life and achievements of Rosalind Franklin, a scientist of exceptional distinction, whose pioneering work helped lay the foundations of molecular biology; Franklin’s X-ray observation of DNA contributed to the discovery of its helical structure."
 2018, the Rosalind Franklin Institute, an autonomous medical research centre under the join venture of 10 universities and funded by the United Kingdom Research and Innovation, was launched at the Harwell Science and Innovation Campus on 6 June, and was officially opened on 29 September 2021.
 2019, the European Space Agency (ESA) named its ExoMars rover Rosalind Franklin.
 2019, the University of Portsmouth announced that it changed the name James Watson Halls to Rosalind Franklin Halls from 2 September.
 2020, Franklin was selected for the Time 100 Women of the Year, for 1953.
 2020, the UK Royal Mint released a 50-pence coin in honour of the hundredth anniversary of Franklin's birth on 25 July. It features a stylized version of Photo 51.
 2020, South Norfolk Council renamed a road on the Norwich Research Park in her honour in July 2020. The road is home to the Quadram Institute and the University of East Anglia's Bob Champion Research and Education Building.
 2020, Trinity College Dublin announced that its library had previously held forty busts, all of whom were of men, was commissioning four new busts of women one of whom would be Franklin.
 2020, Aston Medical School instituted an annual competition for medical students named the Rosalind Franklin Essay Prize, funded by its alumni and Rosalind's nephew, Daniel Franklin, executive and diplomatic editor of The Economist.
 2021, a bronze tondo of Rosalind Franklin was placed on Hampstead Manor and unveiled on 15 March.
 On 30 June 2021, a satellite named after her (ÑuSat 19 or "Rosalind", COSPAR 2021-059AC) was launched into space.
 2021, the Rosalind Franklin laboratory was opened in the Royal Leamington Spa, Warwickshire, on 13 July as the largest laboratory for COVID-19 testing under the UK Health Security Agency and National Health Service Test and Trace network, and supported by the University of Warwick.
 2022, the new bacterial genus, Franklinella, in the family Comamonadaceae, was described in her honour.

Cultural references
Franklin's part in the discovery of the nature of DNA was shown in the 1987 TV Movie Life Story, starring Juliet Stevenson as Franklin, and with Tim Pigott-Smith as Crick, Alan Howard as Wilkins and Jeff Goldblum as Watson. This movie portrayed Franklin as somewhat stern, but also alleged that Watson and Crick did use a lot of her work to do theirs.

A 56-minute documentary of the life and scientific contributions of Franklin, DNA – Secret of Photo 51, was broadcast in 2003 on PBS Nova. Narrated by Barbara Flynn, the program features interviews with Wilkins, Gosling, Klug, Maddox, including Franklin's friends Vittorio Luzzati, Caspar, Anne Piper, and Sue Richley. The UK version produced by BBC is titled Rosalind Franklin: DNA's Dark Lady.

The first episode of another PBS documentary serial, DNA, was aired on 4 January 2004. The episode titled The Secret of Life centres much around the contributions of Franklin. Narrated by Jeff Goldblum, it features Watson, Wilkins, Gosling and Peter Pauling (son of Linus Pauling).

A play entitled Rosalind: A Question of Life was written by Deborah Gearing to mark the work of Franklin, and was first performed on 1 November 2005 at the Birmingham Repertory Theatre, and published by Oberon Books in 2006.

Another play, Photograph 51 by Anna Ziegler, published in 2011, has been produced at several places in the US and in late 2015 was put on at the Noel Coward Theatre, London, with Nicole Kidman playing Franklin. Ziegler's version of the 1951–53 'race' for the structure of DNA sometimes emphasizes the pivotal role of Franklin's research and her personality. Although sometimes altering history for dramatic effect, the play nevertheless illuminates many of the key issues of how science was and is conducted.

False Assumptions by Lawrence Aronovitch is a play about the life of Marie Curie in which Franklin is portrayed as frustrated and angry at the lack of recognition for her scientific contributions. Hostility between the two is also depicted in season 3 of Harvey Girls Forever.

Franklin is fictionalised in Marie Benedict's novel Her Hidden Genius, released in January 2022.

Franklin was noted as "the chemist that actually discovered DNA" in episode three of the 2019 Netflix series Daybreak.

Publications
Rosalind Franklin's most notable publications are listed below. The last two were published posthumously.

See also
 Timeline of women in science
 Cecilia Payne-Gaposchkin, astronomer who discovered the most elemental composition of stars

References

Citations

Sources

 
 
 
 
 Elkin, L. O., Rosalind Franklin and the Double Helix Physics Today March 2003, pp. 42–48.
 
 
 
 
 
 Holt, J. (2002) "Photo Finish: Rosalind Franklin and the great DNA race" The New Yorker October
 
 
 
 
 
 
 
 
 Watson, J. Letter to Science, 164, p. 1539, 27 (1969).

Further reading

External links

 
 
 
 Recordings by Aaron Klug at Web of Stories:
 
 
 
 
 
 
 
  by Sir Aaron Klug
  The first American newspaper coverage of the discovery of the structure of DNA.
 
  Website for television program first broadcast in 2003
 
  Documents from the Churchill Archives Centre, Cambridge. Also available at 
 
 
 
 
 

1920 births
1958 deaths
20th-century British biologists
20th-century British chemists
20th-century English scientists
20th-century British women scientists
Academics of Birkbeck, University of London
Academics of King's College London
Alumni of Newnham College, Cambridge
Burials at Willesden Jewish Cemetery
Carbon scientists
Civil Defence Service personnel
British crystallographers
Deaths from cancer in England
Deaths from ovarian cancer
English agnostics
English Jews
English molecular biologists
English physical chemists
English women biologists
English women chemists
Rosalind
Jewish agnostics
Jewish biophysicists
Jewish British scientists
Jewish women scientists
People educated at Norland Place School
People educated at St Paul's Girls' School
People from Notting Hill